Barren Hill is an unincorporated community in Whitemarsh Township, Montgomery County in the Commonwealth of Pennsylvania, United States. It was first settled in the 18th century.

The borders with nearby Lafayette Hill are unclear.

Etymology
The origin of the town's name is uncertain. While probably a corruption of Barn Hill, it might refer to the sheer barren areas in the community.

External links
 https://web.archive.org/web/20130508015248/http://www.whitemarshtwp.org/information/township-history.aspx

Unincorporated communities in Montgomery County, Pennsylvania
Unincorporated communities in Pennsylvania